This article contains a list of countries by rate of natural increase.

Methodology 
The rate of natural increase is defined as the crude birth rate minus the crude death rate. It is expressed as a rate per 1,000 population.

Countries and subnational areas 
The birth rates and death rates in columns one and two are the CIA World Factbook estimates for the year 2022 unless otherwise noted, rounded to the nearest tenth (except for Mayotte and the Falkland Islands with 2010 and 2012 estimates respectively). The natural increase rate in column three is calculated from the rounded values of columns one and two. Rates are the average annual number of births or deaths during a year per 1,000 persons; these are also known as crude birth or death rates.

Column four is from the UN Population Division  and shows a projection for the average natural increase rate for the time period shown using the medium fertility variant. Blank cells in column four indicate lack of data.

Summary by region 
The table below assembles history and projections for the major regions shown. The numbers show total births minus total deaths per 1,000 population for the region for each time period. The first four columns show actual rate of natural increase. The remaining columns show projections using the medium fertility variant. All numbers are from the UN Population Division.

See also
Demographics of the world
List of countries by population growth rate

Notes

References

See also

Countries by natural increase